Katia Marie Margaritoglou, in Greek: Κάτια Μαργαρίτογλου, is a  Greek fashion model and beauty contestant. In 1998, she won the title Miss Hellas at the Miss Star Hellas pageant and represented Greece at the Miss World 1998 pageant event which took place in the Seychelles. Her face has appeared on the covers of such magazines as Life & Style, Men Magazine and Money & Life as well as in numerous fashion catalogue books and advertisements. She is currently represented by Ace Models.

Job Appearances
BOSS
Life & Style
Men Magazine
Money & Life

External links
Ace Models
Fashion Gates

1983 births
Living people
Greek female models
Miss World 1998 delegates
Models from Athens